Westwood High School (abbreviated WHS) is a public, four-year secondary school in the Anderson Mill neighborhood, Austin, Texas, and is part of the Round Rock Independent School District.

In 2013, Westwood was ranked the 57th best high school in the nation and the 8th best high school in Texas by Newsweek and The Daily Beast. Children at Risk ranked Westwood as the number 2 public high school in Austin in 2012.

Westwood offers honors and Advanced Placement courses to all students and further houses a district level International Baccalaureate magnet program. This combination of honors, AP and IB courses supports not only a robust college matriculation rate but also imparts a college preparatory element to upper division courses. As of the 2012-2013 school year, the school had an enrollment of 2582 students and 162.34 classroom teachers (on an FTE basis), for a student-teacher ratio of 15.9. In April 2022, there were 2,751 students enrolled at Westwood High School.

Demographics
The demographic breakdown of the 2,582 students enrolled for the 2012-2013 school year was:

Male - 50.8%
Female - 49.2%
Native American/Alaskan - 0.3%
Asian/Pacific islander - 28.6%
African American- 2.8%
Hispanic - 14.3%
White - 49.5%
Multiracial - 4.5%

In addition, 12.4% of the population was eligible for free or reduced lunch.

The demographic breakdown of the 2751 students enrolled for the 2020-2021 school year was:

Native American - 0.5%
Asian/Pacific islander - 36.1%
African American- 3%
Hispanic - 18.4%
White - 37.4%
Two or more races - 4.6%
Additionally 10.7% of the students population are considered economically disadvantaged

Academics

In the class of 2009, 73% of Westwood seniors took at least one Advanced Placement (AP) or International Baccalaureate (IB) exam, averaging 5.1 exams per test taker, with a participant pass rate of 91.2%. For the class of 2010, the mean composite SAT score was 1801 out of 2400, and the mean ACT score was 26.4. In 2013, Westwood produced 50 National Merit Semifinalists, one of the highest numbers in the nation.

Advanced coursework

Advanced Placement
Westwood offers 25 AP classes.

Clubs and organizations

Robotics Club
Starting in 2005, the robotics team (The RoboWarriors) has participated in several competitions, primarily FRC (FIRST Robotics Competition) (Team #2583) and BEST (Boosting Engineering, Science, and Technology)(Team #268). In 2014, the RoboWarriors took second place at regional BEST and moved onto state, along with the award for "The Most Aesthetically Pleasing Robot." In 2015, the RoboWarriors hosted BEST at Westwood, and won first place in exhibit, marketing, and overall, and also took home the "Best Youtube Video" award, along with moving onto state. During FRC, the RoboWarriors made it to semifinals on an alliance led by team 1477, Texas Torque, and team 2158, the AusTin Cans. At the same competition they took home the "Entrepreneurship Award".

Chess Club

In 2009 Westwood traveled to the National Scholastic K-12 Championship, where the 10th grade team won first and the 12th grade team tied for first; the 9th and 11th grade teams placed third and fourth in their sections respectively.

Feeder Patterns

Two middle schools feed into this school:
Canyon Vista
Grisham

Six elementary schools feed into this school:
Kathy Caraway
Laurel Mountain
Spicewood (An IB World School)
Anderson Mill
Canyon Creek (A US Exemplary School)
Purple Sage (A US Recognized School)

It is also possible for students attending other schools in the district to enroll in this high school through the IB Academy or Fine Arts Academy, unless either of the two programs are offered at their home school.

Notable alumni
 Brent Clevlen (born 1983), baseball player
 Kelly Johnson, baseball player
 Savan Kotecha, Grammy-nominated songwriter and record producer
 Glen Powell (born 1988), Actor
 Eric Cervini, Author, historian, activist
 Camilla Luddington (born 1983), actress best known for her role as Jo Wilson on ABC's Grey's Anatomy, attended Westwood High School for one year
 Brian Vera (born 1981), American boxer

References

External links

 Official website
 TEA Rating

Educational institutions established in 1980
Round Rock Independent School District
High schools in Austin, Texas
Public high schools in Texas